Abderzak Bella (born 26 September 1970) is an Algerian swimmer. He competed in the men's 100 metre breaststroke and men's 200 metre breaststroke events at the 1992 Summer Olympics.

References

External links
 

1970 births
Living people
Algerian male swimmers
Male breaststroke swimmers
Olympic swimmers of Algeria
Swimmers at the 1992 Summer Olympics
Place of birth missing (living people)
20th-century Algerian people